Tokat Airport  is an airport built in 1995 in Tokat, the city in inner Black Sea region of Turkey. Flights from the airport were halted and resumed again several times, most recently in 2017. Construction on a new airport started in 2018 and was completed in 2022. Since March 2022, Turkish Airlines operates flights from Tokat Airport to Istanbul.

History 

The initial airport was constructed in 1995. Tokat Airport was closed in 2001, re-opened in 2006, and closed again in 2008. Also in 2008, a nearby mosque minaret was shortened for posing a risk to flight safety. Operations continued in 2010 until April 2017, when all scheduled flights were stopped due to Borajet, the only carrier then serving the airport, ceasing operations. At a length of 1700 meters, the old runway was only long enough for smaller regional aircraft to land, which were only operated by Borajet in Turkey.

The construction of a new airport started next to the old one in 2018. The new airport has a capacity of seven aircraft, and is able to accommodate wide-body and cargo aircraft. The airport was re-opened on 25 March 2022.

Airlines and destinations
On 25 March 2022, operations resumed from the re-built airport from after a five year absence of passenger traffic.

Statistics

References

 

Tokat
Airports in Turkey
Buildings and structures in Tokat Province
Transport in Tokat Province
Airports established in 1995
1995 establishments in Turkey
Airports disestablished in 2017
2017 disestablishments in Turkey
Airports established in 2022
2022 establishments in Turkey